Bundesstraße 244 (abbreviation: B 244) is a federal road in Germany that branches off the B 4 west of Dedelstorf towards the east and runs through Wittingen, Brome, Rühen, Velpke, Helmstedt, Schöningen, Dardesheim, Wernigerode to Elbingerode, where it ends at the B 27.

Route/junctions

See also 
 List of federal highways in Germany

244